Ernie Ansterburg (October 1, 1891 – October 16, 1924) was an American racecar driver.

Biography
Ernest Putnam Ansterburg was born on October 1, 1891 in Concord, Michigan. He participated in the 1924 Indianapolis 500. He was killed in a crash at Charlotte Speedway in Charlotte, North Carolina on October 16, 1924 during a practice lap at the age of 33. He crashed into the upper guardrail during the morning practice of the track's first race. Mechanical investigation showed the accident was caused by a broken front suspension.

Indianapolis 500 results

References

External links

1891 births
1924 deaths
People from Concord, Michigan
Racing drivers from Michigan
Indianapolis 500 drivers
AAA Championship Car drivers
Racing drivers who died while racing
Sports deaths in North Carolina